Lost in the Chamber of Love (Traditional Chinese: 西廂奇緣) is a TVB costume drama series released overseas in December 2004 and broadcast on TVB Jade Channel in February 2005.

Synopsis

Cheung Kwan-Sui (Ron Ng) and Hung Leung (Myolie Wu) each picks up one half of a matching jade at a lantern fair. However, they do not meet each other that night. At the same fair, Sui saves the Governor's daughter Chui Ang-Ang (Michelle Ye) from some kidnappers. The Governor's wife promises to marry Ang-Ang to him in order to thank him. Nevertheless, she denies her promise later and demands him to become a royal scholar before Sui can marry Ang-Ang. He moves into the West Chamber, their guesthouse, and studies hard.

The Emperor Tong Dak-Chung (Kenneth Ma) meets Ang Ang when he is traveling incognito under the name of Bun. He is shocked by her beauty.  They get on very well.  However, Ang-Ang is deterred to develop further in their relationship by her engagement with Sui.  Apart from this love triangle, there is one more girl Leung, who loves Sui at the first sight.  Leung is Ang-Ang's servant and best friend. She has to hide her feelings for Sui although she cares a lot about Ang-Ang's decision in choosing between Bun and Shui. Meanwhile, the imperial court sets out a search for a Tibetan princess who is engaged to the Emperor, but has gone missing. Secrets about their lives are suddenly revealed and will change their destiny...

Cast

The Chui family

The Cheung family

Other cast

External links
TVB.com Lost in the Chamber of Love - Official Website 

TVB dramas
2005 Hong Kong television series debuts
2005 Hong Kong television series endings